Harold Clayton Urey (April 29, 1893 – January 5, 1981) was an American physical chemist whose pioneering work on isotopes earned him the Nobel Prize in Chemistry in 1934 for the discovery of deuterium. He played a significant role in the development of the atom bomb, as well as contributing to theories on the development of organic life from non-living matter.

Born in Walkerton, Indiana, Urey studied thermodynamics under Gilbert N. Lewis at the University of California, Berkeley. After he received his PhD in 1923, he was awarded a fellowship by the American-Scandinavian Foundation to study at the Niels Bohr Institute in Copenhagen. He was a research associate at Johns Hopkins University before becoming an associate professor of Chemistry at Columbia University. In 1931, he began work with the separation of isotopes that resulted in the discovery of deuterium.

During World War II, Urey turned his knowledge of isotope separation to the problem of uranium enrichment. He headed the group located at Columbia University that developed isotope separation using gaseous diffusion. The method was successfully developed, becoming the sole method used in the early post-war period. After the war, Urey became professor of chemistry at the Institute for Nuclear Studies, and later Ryerson professor of chemistry at the University of Chicago.

Urey speculated that the early terrestrial atmosphere was composed of ammonia, methane, and hydrogen. One  of his Chicago graduate students was Stanley L. Miller, who showed in the Miller–Urey experiment that, if such a mixture were exposed to electric sparks and water, it can interact to produce amino acids, commonly considered the building blocks of life. Work with isotopes of oxygen led to pioneering the new field of paleoclimatic research. In 1958, he accepted a post as a professor at large at the new University of California, San Diego (UCSD), where he helped create the science faculty. He was one of the founding members of UCSD's school of chemistry, which was created in 1960. He became increasingly interested in space science, and when Apollo 11 returned moon rock samples from the moon, Urey examined them at the Lunar Receiving Laboratory.  Lunar astronaut Harrison Schmitt said that Urey approached him as a volunteer for a one-way mission to the Moon, stating "I will go, and I don't care if I don't come back."

Early life 
Harold Clayton Urey was born on April 29, 1893, in Walkerton, Indiana, the son of Samuel Clayton Urey, a school teacher and a minister in the Church of the Brethren, and his wife, Cora Rebecca née Reinoehl. He had a younger brother, Clarence, and a younger sister, Martha. The family moved to Glendora, California, after Samuel became seriously ill with tuberculosis, in hopes that the climate would improve his health.  When it became clear that he would die, the family moved back to Indiana to live with Cora's widowed mother. Samuel died when Harold was six years old.

Urey was educated in an Amish grade school, from which he graduated at the age of 14. He then attended high school in Kendallville, Indiana. After graduating in 1911, he obtained a teacher's certificate from Earlham College, and taught in a small school house in Indiana. He later moved to Montana, where his mother was then living, and continued to teach there.

Urey entered the University of Montana in Missoula in the autumn of 1914. Unlike Eastern universities of the time, the University of Montana was co-educational in both students and teachers. Urey earned a Bachelor of Science (BS) degree in zoology there in 1917.

As a result of the United States entry into World War I that same year, there was strong pressure to support the war effort.  Urey had been raised in a religious sect that opposed war. One of his professors suggested that he support the wartime effort by working as a chemist.  Urey took a job with the Barrett Chemical Company in Philadelphia, making TNT, rather than joining the army as a soldier. After the war, he returned to the University of Montana as an instructor in chemistry.

An academic career required a doctorate, so in 1921 Urey enrolled in a PhD program at the University of California, Berkeley, where he studied thermodynamics under Gilbert N. Lewis. His initial attempt at a thesis was on the ionization of cesium vapor. He ran into difficulties, and Meghnad Saha published a better paper on the same subject. Urey then wrote his thesis on the ionization states of an ideal gas, which was subsequently published in the Astrophysical Journal. After he received his PhD in 1923, Urey was awarded a fellowship by the American-Scandinavian Foundation to study at the Niels Bohr Institute in Copenhagen, where he met Werner Heisenberg, Hans Kramers, Wolfgang Pauli, Georg von Hevesy, and John Slater. At the conclusion of his stay, he traveled to Germany, where he met Albert Einstein and James Franck.

On returning to the United States, Urey received an offer of a National Research Council fellowship to Harvard University, and also received an offer to be a research associate at Johns Hopkins University. He chose the latter. Before taking up the job, he traveled to Seattle, Washington, to visit his mother. On the way, he stopped by Everett, Washington, where he knew Dr. Kate Daum, a colleague from the University of Montana. Dr. Daum introduced Urey to her sister, Frieda. Urey and Frieda soon became engaged. They were married at her father's house in Lawrence, Kansas, in 1926. The couple had four children: Gertrude Bessie (Elizabeth), born in 1927; Frieda Rebecca, born in 1929; Mary Alice, born in 1934; and John Clayton Urey, born in 1939.

At Johns Hopkins, Urey and Arthur Ruark wrote Atoms, Quanta and Molecules (1930), one of the first English texts on quantum mechanics and its applications to atomic and molecular systems. In 1929, Urey became an associate professor of Chemistry at Columbia University, where his colleagues included Rudolph Schoenheimer, David Rittenberg, and T. I. Taylor.

Deuterium 
In the 1920s, William Giauque and Herrick L. Johnston discovered the stable isotopes of oxygen. Isotopes were not well understood at the time; James Chadwick would not discover the neutron until 1932. Two systems were in use for classifying them, based on chemical and physical properties. The latter was determined using the mass spectrograph. Since it was known that the atomic weight of  oxygen was almost exactly 16 times as heavy as hydrogen, Raymond Birge, and Donald Menzel hypothesized that hydrogen had more than one isotope as well. Based upon the difference between the results of the two methods, they predicted  that only one hydrogen atom in 4,500 was of the heavy isotope.

In 1931, Urey set out to find it. Urey had access to a  grating spectrograph, a sensitive device that had been recently installed at Columbia and was capable of resolving the Balmer series. With a resolution of 1 Å per millimetre, the machine should have produced a difference of about 1 millimetre. However, since only one atom in 4,500 was heavy, the line on the spectrograph was very faint. Urey therefore decided to delay publishing their results until he had more conclusive evidence that it was heavy hydrogen.

Urey and Murphy calculated from the Debye model that the heavy isotope would have a slightly higher boiling point than the light one. By carefully warming liquid hydrogen, 5 litres of liquid hydrogen could be distilled to 1 millilitre, which would be enriched in the heavy isotope by 100 to 200 times. To obtain five litres of liquid hydrogen, they traveled to the cryogenics laboratory at the National Bureau of Standards in Washington, D.C., where they obtained the help of Ferdinand Brickwedde, whom Urey had known at Johns Hopkins.

To their surprise, this showed no evidence of enrichment. On this sample, the Balmer lines for heavy hydrogen were seven times as intense. The paper announcing the discovery of heavy hydrogen, later named deuterium, was jointly published by Urey, Murphy, and Brickwedde in 1932. Urey was awarded the Nobel Prize in Chemistry in 1934 "for his discovery of heavy hydrogen". He declined to attend the ceremony in Stockholm, so that he could be present at the birth of his daughter Mary Alice.

Working with Edward W. Washburn from the Bureau of Standards, Urey subsequently discovered the cause of the anomalous sample. Brickwedde's hydrogen had been separated from water by electrolysis, resulting in a depleted sample. Moreover, Francis William Aston had reported that his calculated value for the atomic weight of hydrogen was wrong, thereby invalidating Birge and Menzel's original reasoning. The discovery of deuterium stood, however.

Urey and Washburn attempted to use electrolysis to create pure heavy water. Their technique was sound, but they were beaten to it in 1933 by Lewis, who had the resources of the University of California at his disposal. Using the Born–Oppenheimer approximation, Urey and David Rittenberg calculated the properties of gases containing hydrogen and deuterium. They extended this to enriching compounds of carbon, nitrogen, and oxygen. These could be used as tracers in biochemistry, resulting in a whole new way of examining chemical reactions.  He founded the Journal of Chemical Physics in 1932, and was its first editor, serving in that capacity until 1940.

At Columbia, Urey chaired the University Federation for Democracy and Intellectual Freedom. He supported Atlanticist Clarence Streit's proposal for a federal union of the world's major democracies, and the republican cause during the Spanish Civil War. He was an early opponent of German Nazism and assisted refugee scientists, including Enrico Fermi, by helping them find work in the United States, and to adjust to life in a new country.

Manhattan Project 
By the time World War II broke out in Europe in 1939, Urey was recognized as a world expert on isotope separation. Thus far, separation had involved only the light elements. In 1939 and 1940, Urey published two papers on the separation of heavier isotopes in which he proposed centrifugal separation. This assumed great importance due to speculation by Niels Bohr that uranium 235 was fissile. Because it was considered "very doubtful whether a chain reaction can be established without separating 235 from the rest of the uranium," Urey began intensive studies of how uranium enrichment might be achieved. Apart from centrifugal separation, George Kistiakowsky suggested that gaseous diffusion might be a possible method. A third possibility was thermal diffusion. Urey coordinated all isotope separation research efforts, including the effort to produce heavy water, which could be used as a neutron moderator in nuclear reactors.

In May 1941, Urey was appointed to the Committee on Uranium, which oversaw the uranium project as part of the National Defense Research Committee (NDRC).  In 1941, Urey and George B. Pegram led a diplomatic mission to England to establish co-operation on development of the atomic bomb. The British were optimistic about gaseous diffusion, but it was clear that both gaseous and centrifugal methods faced formidable technical obstacles. In May 1943, as the Manhattan Project gained momentum. Urey became head of the wartime Substitute Alloy Materials Laboratories (SAM Laboratories) at Columbia, which was responsible for the heavy water and all the isotope enrichment processes except Ernest Lawrence's electromagnetic process.

Early reports on the centrifugal method indicated that it was not as efficient as predicted. Urey suggested that a more efficient but technically more complicated countercurrent system be used instead of the previous flow-through method. By November 1941, technical obstacles seemed formidable enough for the process to be abandoned. Countercurrent centrifuges were developed after the war, and today are the favored method in many countries.

The gaseous diffusion process remained more encouraging, although it too had technical obstacles to overcome. By the end of 1943, Urey had over 700 people working for him on gaseous diffusion. The process involved hundreds of cascades, in which corrosive uranium hexafluoride diffused through gaseous barriers, becoming progressively more enriched at every stage. A major problem was finding proper seals for the pumps, but by far the greatest difficulty lay in constructing an appropriate diffusion barrier. Construction of the huge K-25 gaseous diffusion plant was well under way before a suitable barrier became available in quantity in 1944. As a backup, Urey championed thermal diffusion.

Worn out by the effort, Urey left the project in February 1945, handing over his responsibilities to R. H. Crist. The K-25 plant commenced operation in March 1945, and as the bugs were worked out, the plant operated with remarkable efficiency and economy. For a time, uranium was fed into the S50 liquid thermal diffusion plant, then the K-25 gaseous, and finally the Y-12 electromagnetic separation plant; but soon after the war ended the thermal and electromagnetic separation plants were closed down, and separation was performed by K-25 alone. Along with its twin, K-27, constructed in 1946, it became the principal isotope separation plant in the early post-war period. For his work on the Manhattan Project, Urey was awarded the Medal for Merit by the Project director, Major General Leslie R. Groves, Jr.

Post-war years 
After the war, Urey became professor of chemistry at the Institute for Nuclear Studies, and then became Ryerson professor of chemistry at the University of Chicago in 1952. He did not continue his pre-war research with isotopes. The ratio of the isotopes could then be used to determine average temperatures, assuming that the measurement equipment was sufficiently sensitive. The team included his colleague Ralph Buchsbaum. Examination of a 100-million-year-old belemnite then indicated the summer and winter temperatures that it had lived through over a period of four years. For this pioneering paleoclimatic research, Urey was awarded the Arthur L. Day Medal by the Geological Society of America, and the Goldschmidt Medal of the Geochemical Society. While at the University of Chicago, Urey contributed to the Urey-Bigeleisen-Mayer equation, a model of stable isotope fractionation.

Urey actively campaigned against the 1946 May-Johnson bill because he feared that it would lead to military control of nuclear energy, but supported and fought for the McMahon bill that replaced it, and ultimately created the Atomic Energy Commission. Urey's commitment to the ideal of world government dated from before the war, but the possibility of nuclear war made it only more urgent in his mind. He went on lecture tours against war, and became involved in Congressional debates regarding nuclear issues. He argued publicly on behalf of Ethel and Julius Rosenberg, and was called before the House Un-American Activities Committee.

Cosmochemistry and the Miller–Urey experiment
In later life, Urey helped develop the field of cosmochemistry and is credited with coining the term. His work on oxygen-18 led him to develop theories about the abundance of the chemical elements on earth, and of their abundance and evolution in the stars. Urey summarized his work in The Planets: Their Origin and Development (1952). Urey speculated that the early terrestrial atmosphere was composed of ammonia, methane, and hydrogen. One of his Chicago graduate students, Stanley L. Miller, showed in the Miller–Urey experiment that, if such a mixture is exposed to electric sparks and to water, it can interact to produce amino acids, commonly considered the building blocks of life.

Urey spent a year in the United Kingdom as a visiting professor at Oxford University in 1956 and 1957. In 1958, he reached the University of Chicago's retirement age of 65, but he accepted a post as a professor at large at the new University of California, San Diego (UCSD), and moved to La Jolla, California. He was subsequently made a professor emeritus there from 1970 to 1981. Urey helped build up the science faculty there. He was one of the founding members of UCSD's school of chemistry, which was created in 1960, along with Stanley Miller, Hans Suess, and Jim Arnold.

In the late 1950s and early 1960s, space science became a topic of research in the wake of the launch of Sputnik I. Urey helped persuade NASA to make unmanned probes to the moon a priority. When Apollo 11 returned moon rock samples from the moon, Urey examined them at the Lunar Receiving Laboratory. The samples supported Urey's contention that the moon and the Earth shared a common origin. While at UCSD, Urey published 105 scientific papers, 47 of them about lunar topics. When asked why he continued to work so hard, he joked, "Well, you know I'm not on tenure anymore."

Death and legacy 
Urey enjoyed gardening and raising cattleya, cymbidium and other orchids. He died at La Jolla, California, and is buried in the Fairfield Cemetery in DeKalb County, Indiana.

Apart from his Nobel Prize, he also won the Franklin Medal in 1943, the J. Lawrence Smith Medal in 1962, the Gold Medal of the Royal Astronomical Society in 1966, the Golden Plate Award of the American Academy of Achievement in 1966, and the Priestley Medal of the American Chemical Society in 1973. In 1964 he received the National Medal of Science. He became a Fellow of the Royal Society in 1947. Named after him are lunar impact crater Urey, asteroid 4716 Urey, and the H. C. Urey Prize, awarded for achievement in planetary sciences by the American Astronomical Society. The Harold C. Urey Middle School in Walkerton, Indiana, is also named for him, as is Urey Hall, the chemistry building at Revelle College, UCSD, in La Jolla and the Harold C. Urey Lecture Hall at the University of Montana.  UCSD has also established a Harold C. Urey chair whose first holder is James Arnold.

Urey's daughter, Elizabeth Baranger, also became a notable physicist.

See also 
 Carbonate–silicate cycle

Notes

References 
 Urey, H. C. (1952). The planets: Their origin and development. Mrs. Hepsa Ely Silliman Memorial Lectures. Document in which Urey describes the carbonate–silicate geochemical cycle controlling the long-term climate on Earth during the geological ages (see Berner, Lasaga and Garrels (1983) on the subject).

External links 
 Harold Clayton Urey Papers MSS 44. Special Collections & Archives, UC San Diego Library.
1965 Audio Interview with Harold Urey by Stephane Groueff Voices of the Manhattan Project
 National Academy of Sciences biography
 Harold Urey – Explaining why he rejects the notion of the moon breaking away from the earth – 1972
  including the Nobel Lecture on February 14, 1935 Some Thermodynamic Properties of Hydrogen and Deuterium
Guide to the Harold C. Urey Papers 1932-1953 at the University of Chicago Special Collections Research Center

1893 births
1981 deaths
People from Leonia, New Jersey
People from St. Joseph County, Indiana
Manhattan Project people
Nobel laureates in Chemistry
American atheists
American Nobel laureates
American physical chemists
American astronomers
National Medal of Science laureates
Columbia University faculty
UC Berkeley College of Chemistry alumni
University of Chicago faculty
Planetary scientists
Recipients of the Gold Medal of the Royal Astronomical Society
Foreign Members of the Royal Society
Foreign Fellows of the Indian National Science Academy
Fellows of the American Physical Society
Mass spectrometrists
People from Kendallville, Indiana
Members of the Royal Academy of Belgium
The Journal of Chemical Physics editors
Presidents of the Geochemical Society
Recipients of the V. M. Goldschmidt Award